Northridge Preparatory School, or Northridge Prep, or NRP is an independent college preparatory school for young men, located in Niles, Illinois. The school offers a recognized curriculum and a strong athletics program.

Northridge was established in 1976 by a group of parents who envisioned a college preparatory school that would challenge their sons academically, socially and spiritually. Realizing the importance of the middle school years, they sought to include grades 6 through 12 in the Northridge curriculum. The founding parents entrusted the spiritual dimension of Northridge to Opus Dei, a Personal prelature of the Roman Catholic Church that was founded in 1928.

Northridge is the brother school of The Willows Academy, a girls college preparatory school in Des Plaines, Illinois; parents continue to foster a relationship with The Willows Academy by organizing dances and social events throughout the school year.

The School is a member of The Independent School League and Illinois High School Association.

Academics
The academic program is grounded in the classical liberal arts tradition. Academically, the program has been recognized by U.S. News & World Report, the Chicago Sun Times, and Chicago Magazine.  The school graduates numerous AP Scholars, National Merit Scholarship recipients and students whose ACT and SAT scores rank among the top in the state.

The Halls System
Northridge students are divided into four halls: Cavalier, Riddervon, Paladin, and Vytis.

The Halls System at Northridge helps foster a spirit of competition among the students through academics, athletics, and community involvement. Each hall competes in various events about once every 3 months for half a day in which students are able to earn points for their hall. The student themselves have no influence on the sports chosen to play, also the sports are at apsolute most 5v5 sports and only get about 10 minutes to play in each sport although there are 9-12 kids per hall in each grade. This Point System provides a basis of motivation for all students in a peer to peer way as an addition to teacher or coach to student motivation. Each hall is managed by a student, the Head of Hall, who is assisted by Head of Tutoring, Head of Athletic Competitions, and Head of Community Involvement. These halls serve as the Northridge's student government. Students need not  hold any of these defined leadership roles to play a leading role in their hall. Any student is able to organize and institute ideas to earn hall points. Because of this decentralized structure, more student ideas come to fruition.

Advisory program
A key element in the Northridge approach to education is the advisory system. Every student has a faculty mentor who meets with him regularly throughout the year for all seven years, and who is always "on call." These regular sessions are meant to help each student pinpoint his academic, personal, and social strengths and weaknesses. They help him get to know himself and to follow through on resolutions to improve. Through these sessions and the support of a faculty mentor, each student is better able to grow in faith & virtue, manage & improve his studies, and discuss his family & social life. Often the advisor's job is simply to listen, to understand and to encourage. In addition to this personal help, all upperclassmen receive intensive college and career counseling. The advisor is also the key link between parents and the school, so that helping each student mature properly is truly the joint effort it should be.

Relationship With The Archdiocese of Chicago 
Northridge was founded by parents as an "independent school" that is guided by the teachings of the Catholic Church and therefore is not financially tied to the Archdiocese as diocesan Catholic schools are.  The school is not listed in the Archdiocese of Chicago school list, and so does not require the Chicago Catholic Schools Placement exam. In 2008, Northridge Prep was awarded the Catholic Honor Roll, which distinguishes it as a "Top 50 Catholic High School in America" under the three criteria of standardized test scores, Catholic Identity and academic curriculum.

Athletics 
Northridge offers a number of athletic activities and plays in the Independent School League. The Knights were Regional Basketball Champs in 2003, 2004, 2008, 2009, 2010, 2014, 2020 and 2022. Sectional Basketball Champs in 2004. The Soccer Team has won Regional Championships in 2011, 2013, and 2014. They were also Cross Country IHSA Sectional Champions in 2017 and State Finalists in 2005, 2006, 2007, 2011, 2012, 2013, 2016, and 2017. The Track team as well became Sectional Champs in 2017, and qualified as State Finalists in the 4x8 meter relay.

Will Rey, former Head Basketball Coach at Loyola University, is Northridge 's Athletic Director and Head Varsity Basketball Coach.

References

External links
Northridge Preparatory School — official website
The Willows Academy — sister school of Northridge Prep
Illinois High School Association record for Niles (Northridge Prep)
Opus Dei – Opus Dei's official U.S. website
Opus Dei — explanation on EWTN website

Educational institutions established in 1976
Roman Catholic Archdiocese of Chicago 
Catholic elementary schools in Illinois
Catholic secondary schools in Illinois
Niles, Illinois
Opus Dei schools
Boys' schools in the United States
Private high schools in Cook County, Illinois
Private middle schools in Cook County, Illinois
1976 establishments in Illinois